Pueblo High School is a high school serving Tucson, Arizona since 1956. It is a school in the Tucson Unified School District, the largest school district in Tucson. Pueblo is the only high school in Tucson that owns a radio station, KWXL-LP.

Early history
The year was 1956, two months before the end of the school year. This long-awaited moment would see the opening of a new school for 900 students. The new school would, for the time being, mark the end of attending classes on double sessions at Tucson High and Roskruge Junior High Schools. “We went down there with freshmen, sophomores and juniors,” Principal Brooks would later recall. The freshmen would be the first group of students to spend four years at Pueblo, becoming the graduating class of 1959.

Over the next several years, several changes to the original facility would occur at Pueblo. One of which was a swimming pool in 1961, “the first in a District 1 school”, and a 2000-seat stadium. The relief from double sessions and an overcrowded school was short lived. By the start of the 1963 school year, the Pueblo student newspaper, El Guerrero declared that Pueblo was “Knee Deep in People.” The school, originally built for a capacity of 1,800 students, had, by this time an active enrollment of 2,489 students.

The rapid growth of Tucson's Southside and the failure of two high school bond issues proposed by the school board were cited by Principal Brooks as key factors. It would be another two years before the will of citizens would provide relief. On the first day of school however, those students with cars may have been less concerned about the crowded conditions. Eager to return to Pueblo, see old friends, and of course study, they found that they could not “hot rod” into the parking lot as speed trap mounds had been strategically placed to calm the flow of traffic. In his welcoming speech to students, which included greetings to two students from Tokyo, Student Body President Rafael Arvizu likely explained the reason for the aggravating “bumps” in the parking lot.

From Tucson High and Roskruge to Pueblo
Located on the south side of Tucson, Pueblo was the first new high school to be built in Tucson School District 1. Preparations for the eventual transition from Tucson High and Roskruge had begun the previous year. Principal Brooks recalled, “Even though we weren’t down at Pueblo, we started our athletic programs, clubs were organized, homerooms and counselors were identified for students and lunch periods for students were assigned.” In essence, even before it opened its doors students were invited to be a part of the Pueblo community.

An alumnus who was among the group of students involved remembered that “we wrote the school constitution, established the traditions and all of that good stuff.” Another remarked, “We were constantly reminded that as the establishing student body, we were the foundation on which our school would be built.” It was “our obligation to our fellow and future students to carefully plan for the future, and to conduct ourselves in a way so that the rest of Tucson could see that Pueblo High School was a great school.” For the students, it was “an exciting time” and one in which the memories clearly bring forth an animated pride. One of the first acts of student leadership involved the naming of the school. Unlike any other high school in the district, students were asked by the board to submit names for the school. Among the several names submitted, “Pueblo was their first choice and the board accepted the name.” In subsequent years, new schools would be named after local mountain ranges and desert plants.

Students were involved in choosing the colors for the school, as well as the various trophies and awards that would become symbols of Pueblo's excellence. 15 Despite the intricate planning and attention to every imaginable detail, including the school colors of Navy and Columbia Blue, Pueblo did not yet have a nickname for the “athletic teams to seek honor, to be shouted, flung at the stands on the opposite side of the fields by Pueblo’s ardent supporters.”

Apparently, local newspapers, at a loss as to what Pueblo's teams should be called, simply referred to the school as the “unknowns.” The matter was soon settled by ballot, when the nickname “Warriors” became official. In 1961, the artistry of Frank Federico created Wally Warrior, which became the emblem on the Pueblo flag. In 1963, Wally Warrior became a part of the Pueblo tradition. Students voted bestowing the honor of the first Wally Warrior on underclassman Jesus Jimenez. Decades later, the Warrior nickname and the tomahawk embedded in a wooden stand created by the Lettermen's Club would become the center of controversy as offensive to some Native American students. Concerns were related to the perceived misuse of sacred symbols and the dance performed by the Wally Warrior mascot. When the controversy arose, students at the time would vote to “keep the warrior name, however, replace the image.”

In the early years, the nickname was chosen because it was believed to embody respect and honor. A group of current Pueblo students when interviewed asserted that the “warrior” symbolizes what Pueblo stands for: “fighting for victory and accomplishing goals.” Appropriately these symbols have been archived with other artifacts of Pueblo's history. Old timers, although sensitive to the concerns of Native Americans about the use of sacred symbols, nonetheless, still greet each other with the preeminent question: “You a warrior?”

The year 1956, was the beginning of a Pueblo history in which over time there would be many reasons to celebrate an educational vision and the accomplishments of the student body, graduates and the faculty.

Achievements
 Awarded Exemplary High School Web Site by the Arizona Technology in Education Alliance (AzTEA) May 2003.

Magnet programs

Communication arts and technology 

Students learn oral, visual and written communication, while preparing for advanced education and careers in multi-media technologies.

Pueblo High Magnet School combines a comprehensive curriculum with an emphasis in communication arts and technology.
 Television and Radio Production
 Multi-Media Production
 Journalism/Desktop Publishing
 Broadcast Writing/Reporting
 Computer Graphics Production
 Computer Animation
 Professional Printing
 Computer Programming
 Electronics
 MESA (Math, Engineering, Science Achievement)
 Computer-Aided Drafting
 Professional Photography
 Graphic Design
 Digital Imaging
 Remote Video and Studio Production

*State-of-the-Art Television Production Facilities including Studio, Non-Linear Computer Editing
 Closed-Circuit Campus Network with Live Productions
 Programming Aired on Tucson's Cable System
 State-of-the-Art Multi-Media Production Facilities
 Internships in Television, Radio, Digital Imaging and Multi-Media Production
 Communication Arts Summer School
 Writing/Reporting for Broadcast
 Digital Music Production
 Schoolwide Radio Programming
 Journalism Classes
 Community Service Opportunities

Notable alumni
 George Arias, former MLB player (Anaheim Angels, San Diego Padres)
 Robert John Bardo, convicted murderer of actress Rebecca Schaffer (dropped out)
 Richard A. Carranza, educator
 Luis Coronel, American Regional Mexican singer
 Fat Lever, former NBA player (Portland Trail Blazers, Denver Nuggets, Dallas Mavericks)
 Francisco Romero, Major League Baseball Spanish broadcaster for the Houston Astros and University of Arizona
 Victor Soltero, Arizona State Senator for District 29
 Leonard Thompson, former NFL player (Detroit Lions)
 Robert Ravago, pitcher for the Miami Marlins organization
 María Urquides (teacher/counselor), national bilingual education leader, "Mother of Bilingual Education"

References

External links
 Official Website
 Glenda Dewberry Rooney, Looking Back, 2006

Public high schools in Arizona
Educational institutions established in 1956
Schools in Tucson, Arizona
Magnet schools in Arizona
1956 establishments in Arizona